The Alexandra wet fly originated in Scotland in the 1860s. The artificial fly is also known as the Lady of the Lake, the fly was named by English angler Major William Greer Turle to honor Alexandra, Princess of Wales. The fly is distinguished by the heavy peacock herl wing and silver body which makes the fly resemble a small baitfish or fry. The Alexandra proved to be a very effective fly for trout in lakes and streams in England and Scotland in the late 19th and early 20th century. Many fly fishing purists derided the fly and its use was once banned on many English waters.

Origin
The fly originated as the Lady of the Lake in the 1860s by an unknown angler, primarily for trout in lakes. The fly gained popularity because it was extremely effective fished slowly on sinking lines. Anglers began using the fly in rivers for sea trout and Atlantic salmon with success. It was so effective, that it was allegedly banned from some waters. In the late 19th century, Major William Greer Turle (March 1839 – January 1909), a prominent English angler, renamed the fly Alexandra to honor Alexandra of Denmark, the daughter-in-law of Queen Victoria and then known as the Princess of Wales (1863 to 1901). Turle was a chalkstream angler with water on the River Test near Newton Stacey. He learned fly tying from George Selwyn Marryat and was a close associate of Frederic M. Halford.

Imitates
The Alexandra is an attractor pattern most likely taken as a small baitfish or fry.

Materials
The Alexandra is typically tied on a 2X/3X long streamer hook with black thread. A TMC 5262 2X long streamer hook would be typical. The tail is typically a few strands of red ibis or goose primary feather. The body is silver tinsel or mylar with an oval tinsel rib. A red floss tag is optional. The underwing is typically strips of red ibis or goose primary feather. The over wing, which distinguishes the Alexandra, is made of six to ten strands of peacock herl from peacock swords. The fly is hackled wet fly style with brown or black hen or cock hackle.

Variations
Typical variations include the use of mottled turkey feather for the underwing, peacock herl for the tail and beads or cones for weight.

Controversy
The "Alexandra", although a successful fly, was not always welcome on the chalk streams of Southern England.

Gallery

References

Wet fly patterns